Andres Tabun (born on 1 December 1954 in Tallinn) is an Estonian actor.

From 1976 until 1999 and again since 2001, he has been employed at the Ugala Theatre. From 1999 until 2001, he worked at the Kuressaare Town Theatre. Besides theatre roles he has played also in several films and television series.

Filmography

 2016 	Mother
 2019 	Tõde ja õigus
 2019 	Ükssarvik

References

Living people
1954 births
Estonian male stage actors
Estonian male film actors
Estonian male television actors
Estonian male radio actors
20th-century Estonian male actors
21st-century Estonian male actors
Male actors from Tallinn